Intermittent hair–follicle dystrophy is a disorder of the hair follicle leading to increased fragility of the shaft, with no identifiable biochemical disturbance, also with an unknown prevalence.

See also 
 Cutaneous conditions
 List of cutaneous conditions

Notes

References
 Birnbaum PS, et al.: Hereditable diseases of the hair. Dermatol Clin 1987;5:137.

Conditions of the skin appendages